I Don't Want to Cry! is Chuck Jackson's debut studio album, released in 1961. The album is completely devoted to songs about crying. 

Jackson co-wrote the title track. It became a Top 40 Pop hit and a Top 5 R&B hit.

The album's design and photography was by Jules Maidoff.

Critical reception
AllMusic wrote that the "hit title cut serves as a springboard to explore 11 other tear-stained tunes, forming a concept record detailing the many subtle gradations of melancholy and heartbreak."

Track listing

Side 1
 "I Don't Want to Cry" (Luther Dixon, Chuck Jackson)
 "Tears on My Pillow" (Al Lewis, Sylvester Bradford)
 "My Willow Tree" (Bob Elgin, Kay Rogers)
 "In Between Tears" (Bob Elgin, Kay Rogers, Luther Dixon)
 "Tear of the Year" (Gary Geld, Peter Udell)
 "I Cried for You" (Abe Lyman, Arthur Freed, Gus Arnheim)

Side 2
 "Lonely Teardrops" (Berry Gordy, Jr., Tryan Carlo)
 "Don't Let the Sun Catch You Crying" (Joe Greene)
 "Salty Tears" (Lincoln Chase)
 "I Wake Up Crying" (Burt Bacharach, Hal David)
 "A Tear" (Luther Dixon, Willie Denson)
 "A Man Ain't Supposed to Cry" (Frankie Laine, Irving Reid, Norman Gimbel)

References

See also 
 I Don't Want to Cry! on Discogs

1961 debut albums
Wand Records albums
Chuck Jackson albums